The Mount Jasper Lithic Source is a prehistoric archaeological site in Berlin, New Hampshire. Located on the slopes of Mount Jasper on the north side of the city, it includes one of the only known evidences of mining by pre-Contact Native Americans in the eastern United States. The mountain is a source of rhyolite, apparently prized for its qualities in the manufacture of stone tools. The site was added to the National Register of Historic Places in 1992.

Description
Mount Jasper is a low peak 1 miles northwest of the confluence of the Dead River and Androscoggin River in Berlin, New Hampshire. It is visually distinguished by a steep rocky slope near its summit. The geology of the mountain includes bands of rhyolite.
The site, owned by the city of Berlin, encompasses a triangular area from the summit to points on the Dead River. Its principal features include one or more short mine shafts that follow the seams of rhyolite in the upper reaches of the mount, and workshop areas at both the summit and river-facing base of the mountain.

Significance
Archaeological investigation of the area conducted in the 1980s identified not only the locations where natives quarried the stone, but has also determined that workshops (where finished materials such as weapon points were fashioned) were located there. Evidence from this and other sites indicates that it was a source of stone for tools as much as 9,000 years ago, and it is unique in the eastern United States in that the natives working the quarry actually tunneled into the mountain. Tools fashioned from stone quarried here have been found at archaeological sites across the northeastern United States.

See also
National Register of Historic Places listings in Coos County, New Hampshire

References

External links
 Mount Jasper Mine - Article about excavations and findings at the site

Archaeological sites on the National Register of Historic Places in New Hampshire
Geography of Coös County, New Hampshire
National Register of Historic Places in Coös County, New Hampshire
Berlin, New Hampshire